Rhodactis is genus of Mushroom corals which are characterized by large individual polyps that are often reminiscent of a mushroom. Rhodactis are related to stony corals but do not produce a stony skeleton.

Species
The following species are recognized in the genus Rhodactis:

 Rhodactis bryoides Haddon & Shackleton, 1893
 Rhodactis howesii Saville-Kent, 1893
 Rhodactis inchoata Carlgren, 1943
 Rhodactis indosinensis Carlgren, 1943
 Rhodactis musciformis Duchassaing & Michelotti, 1864
 Rhodactis osculifera (Le Sueur, 1817)
 Rhodactis rhodostoma (Hemprich & Ehrenberg in Ehrenberg, 1834)

References

Discosomidae
Hexacorallia genera